Macedonian national costumes are part of the material culture of the Macedonian people and they are an important branch of the Macedonian folk art.

Types
Macedonians wore 70 different types of national costumes, depending on the region where people lived, such as: Skopska Blatija, Skopska Crna Gora, Upper Polog, Lower Polog, Prilep-Bitola Plain, Upper Prespa, Lower Prespa, Ohrid Plain, Struga Plain, Drimkol, Malesija, Mariovo, Ovče Pole, Malesevo and many others. Every type of folk costume has its own characteristics, but common for all is the presence of the red, black and the white colour and the geometrical shapes on it.

Gallery

External links 

Macedonian culture
Folk costumes